Alma García (born 1970) is an American short story writer.

Life
Alma Garcia grew up in West Texas, and has lived most of her life in New Mexico.  She graduated from the University of Arizona with an MFA, and afterward worked at the Secret Garden Bookshop in Ballard, Washington.  She lives with her husband, Mike De Lilla, a civil engineer, in Seattle, where she plays violin and sings in a folk-rock band, Landlord's Daughter.

Her work has appeared in Narrative Magazine, Passages North, and Boulevard.

Awards
 2007 Narrative Prize 
 2007 Rona Jaffe Foundation Writers' Award
 2004 Dana Award in Short Fiction
 Jack Straw Writers Program

Works
 
 
 Shallow Waters

References

External links
"Shallow Waters", An Audio Reading, Narrative Magazine

1970 births
Living people
American short story writers
University of Arizona alumni
Rona Jaffe Foundation Writers' Award winners